Sonja Oberem, née Krolik (born 24 February 1973 in Rheydt) is a German athlete, who specialized in the marathon races. In her younger days she was a successful triathlete.

Achievements

Personal bests
Half Marathon - 1:10:13 hrs (1996)
Marathon - 2:26:13 hrs (2001)

External links

 Leverkusen who's who
marathoninfo

1973 births
Living people
German female long-distance runners
German female marathon runners
German female triathletes
Olympic athletes of Germany
Athletes (track and field) at the 1996 Summer Olympics
Athletes (track and field) at the 2000 Summer Olympics
Sportspeople from Mönchengladbach
European Athletics Championships medalists